Fountain Hill Opera House, also known as the Globe Theatre and Grand Opera House, was a historic theater building located at Bethlehem, Northampton County, Pennsylvania.  It was built in 1888, and has been demolished.

It was added to the National Register of Historic Places in 1979.  It was destroyed by an arsonist on August 13, 1983. It was delisted in 1987, after it was demolished.

References

Theatres on the National Register of Historic Places in Pennsylvania
Music venues completed in 1888
Buildings and structures in Northampton County, Pennsylvania
National Register of Historic Places in Northampton County, Pennsylvania
Opera houses on the National Register of Historic Places
Event venues on the National Register of Historic Places in Pennsylvania
Opera houses in Pennsylvania